Trikala is one of the regional units of Greece, forming the northwestern part of the region of Thessaly. Its capital is the town of Trikala. The regional unit includes the town of Kalampaka and the Meteora monastery complex.

Geography

Trikala borders the regional units of Karditsa to the south, Arta to the southwest, Ioannina to the west, Grevena to the north and Larissa to the east.

The southeastern part belongs to the Thessalian Plain. The forested Pindus mountain range dominates the western part. The northern part of Trikala is also mountainous and made up of forests and barren lands, the ranges here are Chasia and Antichasia. Its major river is the Pineios, flowing to the south and east.

Its climate is mainly of Mediterranean character,  with hot summers and cold winters,  along with temperate climate conditions  by the mountains.

Administration

The regional unit Trikala is subdivided into 4 municipalities. These are (number as in the map in the infobox):
Farkadona (4)
Meteora (2)
Pyli (3)
Trikala (1)

Prefecture

Trikala was created as a prefecture in 1882. As a part of the 2011 Kallikratis government reform, the regional unit Trikala was created out of the former prefecture Trikala. The prefecture had the same territory as the present regional unit. At the same time, the municipalities were reorganised, according to the table below.

Provinces

Trikala prefecture had two provinces, named Trikala and Kalampaka, after the two largest towns.
Province of Trikala
Province of Kalampaka
Note: Provinces no longer hold any legal status in Greece.

History

The area of Trikala was relatively obscure in ancient Thessaly, as well as during the periods of Macedonian, Romans, and Byzantine rule. Under the Ottomans, Trikala was known as "Tırhala" and became the seat of the Sanjak of Tirhala, encompassing most of Thessaly, until the late 18th century. Despite a number of rebellions against Ottoman rule, the area remained under Ottoman control until joined with the independent Kingdom of Greece in 1881.

Upon annexation by Greece, Trikala became the seat of one of the two prefectures in which Thessaly was divided (the other being Larissa Prefecture). The area was briefly occupied by the Ottomans again during the Greco-Turkish War of 1897, and by the Italians and Germans during the Axis occupation of Greece in World War II. In 1947, the southern part was split off as Karditsa Prefecture.

Economy

Agriculture

The agriculture of the area is famous, and produces a part of the country's production also in export.  Its well-known production includes fruit and vegetables, cotton, olives, cattle and other foodstuffs.

Communications

Newspapers

I Enimerosi
I Erevna
dialogos-weekly newspaper of Trikala "t.24310-33263,fax.2431-500059" www.issuu.com/dialogosnews

Transport
There are a number of highways and the main railway from Volos to Meteora crosses Thessaly. The region is directly linked to the rest of Europe through International Airport of Central Greece located in Nea Anchialos in a small distance from Trikala. In the 1980s, the Trikala Bypass was opened and between 1998 and 2006, the Via Egnatia was under construction with tunnels and bridges ; the first section was opened in 2002,  and the final section  in 2006.

Greek National Road 6, NW, N, Cen., SE
Greek National Road 15, NW
Greek National Road 30, SW, S

Sports
AO Trikala
Trikala 2000 BC
A.O. Trikala 1963 F.C.
G.S. Trikala
G.E.A. Trikala
G.A.S. Trikala "Zeus"

See also
List of settlements in the Trikala regional unit

References

External links
Prefectural map of Trikala
https://web.archive.org/web/20051027171013/http://www.greecebyclick.com/regions/central/trikala/index.cfm
 

 
Prefectures of Greece
Regional units of Thessaly